Point Blank is the only studio album by heavy metal band Nailbomb, released on March 8, 1994, by Roadrunner Records. The side project Nailbomb was started by Max Cavalera and Alex Newport in the mid-1990s. The first track "Wasting Away" appears in the 1995 film To Die For. The album cover is a female Vietnamese civilian with a U.S. soldier's gun to her head.  The album was played live in its entirety for the first time ever in 2017 by Max Cavalera with his band Soulfly, more than 20 years after the release of the album and the band's break up.  However, Alex Newport was not part of these performances due to his busy schedule. Cavalera's son Zyon performed Newport's vocal and keyboard parts for the tour.

Track listing 
All tracks written by Max Cavalera and Alex Newport unless noted.

Bonus track version 
A remastered version was released on February 24, 2004, with liner notes and extra tracks:

Samples 
"Guerrillas" contains a sample of "Procreation of the Wicked" by Celtic Frost and a sample from the movie Salvador. "Cockroaches" contains a sample from the movie Henry: Portrait of a Serial Killer. "For Fucks Sake" contains samples of GG Allin's last TV appearance on The Jane Whitney Show before his death in June 1993.

Personnel 
Nailbomb
Max Cavalera: vocals, rhythm guitar, bass, sampling (vocals credited as "insults")
Alex Newport: vocals, lead guitar, bass, sampling (vocals credited as "mouthful of hate")

Additional personnel
Andreas Kisser: lead guitar on tracks 2, 9 & 11
Igor Cavalera: drums on tracks 1, 5, 7, 10, 12 & 13
Dino Cazares: rhythm guitar on track 3

Production
Produced by Alex Newport and Max Cavalera
Recorded by Otto Agnello
Mixed by Alex Newport

References 

Nailbomb albums
1994 debut albums
Roadrunner Records albums
Albums produced by Max Cavalera
Albums produced by Alex Newport